Yeh Vaada Raha is a 1982 Hindi romance film starring Rishi Kapoor, Poonam Dhillon, Tina Munim, Rakhee Gulzar and Shammi Kapoor.

Plot  

Vikram Rai Bahadur is the only son of wealthy Mrs. Sharda.
While vacationing in Srinagar, he meets and falls in love with a singer, Sunita Sikkan.
They make a vow to never part till death at the temple where they first met.

Vikram's mother is against the marriage as she feels their business will suffer if Vikram marries penniless Sunita.
Vikram and Sunita decide on a quiet temple wedding. On their way to the temple, they have a car crash. Vikram has a brain injury leading to a coma. Sunita survives but is badly disfigured. 
Sharda convinces Sunita that Vikram can't love  her now and Sunita agrees to stay away from him. Sharda tells Vikram Sunita died in the crash.

Sunita is transferred to a hospital in Delhi where she undergoes plastic surgery, under Dr Mehra who comes to see her as a daughter. As she is no longer disfigured, Sunita goes to Vikram's house only to learn that he is getting engaged to another woman named Rita. Vikram doesn't recognize Sunita and she is heartbroken that he has forgotten her. She changes her name to Kusum Mehra, to begin life anew.

Vikram is building an orphanage in the memory of Sunita in Srinagar & raising money by singing on stage. Kusum and Dr. Mehra attend one of these shows, not knowing that Vikram is the artist performing. When Kusum hears him singing about love, she counters him in a song as she is angry that he would sing such a song when he forgot their love. Her singing voice reminds Vikram of Sunita.
Vikram her to sing with him on stage but she refuses angrily. Dr. Mehra tells Kusum that she should confront Vikram rather than behaving like this. The next day when Kusum leaves her house, Vikram is waiting for her in his car and offers her a lift. On the way they are faced with a similar situation to the earlier accident. Kusum screams and loses consciousness.

When Vikram visits Kusum to see how she is, he finds out that Kusum had previously gone through a similar accident earlier. Kusum asks about an injury on Vikram's forehead. Vikram tells her how he also got in an accident and has forgotten everything. This angers Kusum as she believes he has forgotten her and she accidentally spills every detail she knows about the accident itself.

Vikram's mother finds out that he wants to do a show with a girl called Kusum and he won't marry until this is done. When Sharda visits Kusum to ask her to sing with Vicky, she mentions that she lied to Vikram about Sunita's death and that's why Vikram agreed to marry Rita. Kusum is happy to hear that Vikram didn't forget her, but that he still loves her and is making an orphanage in her memory. She agrees to sing with Vikram and not get in the way of Vikram and Rita's wedding.

Dr. Mehra calls Sharda to his hospital and explains to her how he gave Sunita a new face after her disfigurement. He tells her how Sunita and Kusum are the same person and how Kusum is satisfied only by the fact that Vikram still loves her. Mehra tells Sharda there is still time, and that she can still reunite the two lovers. Sharda doesn't listen to him. Kusum sings with Vikram and also reminds him of Sunita by dancing the way they both would while singing their song "Yeh Vaada Raha". This reminds Vikram of Sunita and at the end of the performance he holds her and calls her Sunita, at which Kusum runs away.

She leaves for Kashmir, asking her father not to tell Vikram anything. Vikram comes seeking Sunita and confronts Mehra. Mehra tells him to ask his mother for answers. Vicky goes to Sharda and asks her whether Kusum is Sunita. His mother tells Vikram everything - about how she lied to him about Sunita being dead because she wanted to protect him and make his future better. Vikram goes to Kashmir to find Sunita and finds her right outside her house. When she sees him she runs to the temple where they made their vows to break their love bond. At the temple they repeat their vows again and embrace each other.

Cast 
 Shammi Kapoor as Dr. Mehra (Cosmetic Surgeon)
 Rakhee Gulzar as Mrs. Sharda Rai Bahadur
 Rishi Kapoor  as Vikram Rai Bahadur
 Poonam Dhillon as Sunita Sikkan  
 Tina Munim as Kusum Mehra / Sunita Sikkan (After Plastic Surgery) 
 Rakesh Bedi as Gogi
 Sarika as Rita Saxena    
 Gulshan Bawra as Sunita's Uncle
 Jaya Bhaduri as Sunita (Voice)
 Iftekhar as Dr. Sahni
 Hari Shivdasani as Pannalal Saxena
 Sunder as Constable

Soundtrack
Music: R. D. Burman & Lyrics: Gulshan Bawra.

Notes 

2. http://www.bollywoodlife.com/news-gossip/before-amitabh-bachchan-jaya-bachchan-had-lent-her-voice-to-two-actress/

External links 
 

1980s Hindi-language films
1982 films
Films scored by R. D. Burman
Rose Audio Visuals
Indian remakes of American films
Indian romantic drama films